XLNT Foods (pronounced "excellent") is one of the oldest companies based in Southern California, and is the longest continuously operating brand of Mexican foods in the United States. They are known for their frozen prepared tamales and chili con carne. XLNT tamales were originally sold by tamaleros out of horse-drawn wagons.

History

XLNT Foods was founded in 1894 by Alejandro Morales as the XLNT Tamale Company. Their tamales became a popular ethnic food in Los Angeles. XLNT had a factory in Boyle Heights and also sold tamales from horse-drawn carts and grocery stores. In 1908, Charles Crawford, of Canadian and Dutch descent, took over the ownership of the company. At the height of their operation the company produced 60 food products. The company was later acquired, in the 1960s, by Alex Foods that also produced tamales and flavored corn chips in Southern California.

In the mid-20th century, XLNT products were popular as convenience foods alongside TV dinners. In 2010, the company changed hands again and was bought by Santa Fe Importers. The company's food products were originally only available in Southern California; they are now shipped nationwide. The company is now based in Long Beach, California.

References

External links
 Official website

Mexican cuisine
Maize products
Companies based in California
Convenience food companies